The Ambassador from Israel to Uruguay is Israel's foremost diplomatic representative in Uruguay.

List of ambassadors
Galit Ronen 2018-
 Nina Ben-Ami 2014 - 2018
Dori Goren 2009 - 2014
Yoel Barnea 2005 - 2009
Joel Salpak 2001 - 2005
Yosef Arad 1997 - 2001
Mordekhay Artzieli 1993 - 1995
Avraham Toledo 1989 - 1993
Menachem Karmi 1984 - 1987
Netanel Matalon 1979 - 1984
Aharon Ofri 1975 - 1979
Dov Schmorak 1972 - 1975
Yaacov Yinon 1968 - 1970
Hagai Dikan1965 - 1968
Yeshayahu Anug 1963 - 1965
Itzhak Harkavi 1960 - 1963
Arie Eshel 1958 - 1960
Joel Baromi 1957 - 1958
Minister Matitiahu Hindes 1956 - 1957
Minister Arieh Leon Kubovy (Non-Resident, Buenos Aires) 1954 - 1955
Minister Jacob Tzur (Non-Resident, Buenos Aires) 1949 - 1953
Jacob Tzur 1948 - 1949

References

Uruguay
Israel